"No Good Deed" is a musical number from the hit Broadway musical Wicked. It is sung by Elphaba, the main character of the show. It is widely regarded as the most powerful piece of the musical; and the most emotional.

Context and analysis
Performed towards the end of Act Two, the song springs from Elphaba's rage over her continuously thwarted efforts to do good and her inner turmoil about her intention for doing so.  It explores the ideas of goodness and wickedness, which are central to the musical's theme.  In the song she lists what she perceives as her failures at goodness, including anger with herself over Fiyero—her lover who is being concurrently tortured by the Wizard's guards over her whereabouts—the death of her sister, and the capture and dehumanisation of her favourite teacher, Dr. Dillamond.  It occurs while Elphaba believes that Glinda has used her sister's death to lure her into being captured by the Wizard's Guard.  She is distraught at being vilified by the Wizard's propaganda and the hatred of the citizens of Oz, and decides she will no longer attempt to do good. The song begins with Elphaba screaming "Fiyero" but instead of being an unhitched scream, she actually sings a high note that is a minor second above the tonal centre of the song.  This creates the effect of a scream, as the note is very high and dissonant, but it is much more controlled and musical than an actual scream. It then moves into a chant of magical words making it the most chilling and foreboding of all the musical's numbers. Schwartz is quoted as likening No Good Deed to an opera aria.  He says, "It’s just written for a different voice type, and it’s not written to be sung amplified. So those are the two big differences. I mean, “No Good Deed” is written for a belter—I suppose a mezzo-soprano could sing it. But the orchestra is so busy and obstreperous throughout that you have to have an amplified voice to carry over it, if you want to hear the words at all. But for instance there's a moment in “No Good Deed” where she belts a big note and then there's a place where it suddenly gets pianissimo — she has to hit the note very loud and hold it, and then get very soft — and that's absolutely like something one would write in classical singing or an opera aria. Or the moment where she does “Nessa, Dr. Dillamond,” and then sort of shouts out “Fiyero” while the orchestra is sawing away at one of the motifs. I think it's structured very much like an aria but it's built to get a great big hand at the end with a big belted last note. So it's still very much musical theatre."

Development
Originally it was sung by Tony Award Winning actress Idina Menzel, who is known for, as Ben Brantley of the New York Times describes it, her "iron strong larynx". Stephen Schwartz composed it specifically to showcase Menzel's belting talent, in addition to giving her a second-act solo song. Idina Menzel, herself, has been quoted as saying that this song was her favourite to sing in the show as it 'reminded her of her Bat Mitzvah.'

Recordings
The song was translated into eight languages, along with the musical. Among these, the German version, sung by Dutch actress Willemijn Verkaik, was featured on the 5th and 10th Anniversary Wicked albums. In Willemijn's 10-year career in the show, she performed this song in three languages - German, Dutch and English. In an interview, she said that for German and Dutch, this song was the hardest to sing in the musical, while this was not the case in English. Instead, the hardest for her was The Wizard and I in the English-language productions.

References

Songs from Wicked (musical)
Songs written by Stephen Schwartz (composer)
2003 songs
Idina Menzel songs